Nestlé Toll House Café is a soon-to-be defunct franchise in the United States and Canada founded by Ziad Dalal and his partner Doyle Liesenfelt. The two started Crest Foods, Inc. D/B/A "Nestlé Toll House Café by Chip" in 2000 in Dallas, Texas. Crest Foods, the master franchisor for Nestlé, is in charge of developing cookie store franchises across the United States as part of Nestlé USA's challenge to the longtime industry leader, Mrs. Fields Famous Cookies Inc. The menu consists of items such as cookies, cookie cakes, brownies, ice cream, milk shakes, smoothies, and a full line of hot and frozen coffee beverages. The Nestlé Toll House Cafés are commonly found in shopping malls or shopping centers.

In May 2022, it was announced Nestlé Toll House Café has been acquired by the California-headquartered restaurant franchising company, FAT Brands for an undisclosed sum. It was also later confirmed that all Nestlé Toll House Café locations would be converted into Great American Cookies locations by the end of 2022.

References

External links

 
Nrm.com
Restaurant News
Franchisetimes.com
Bclocalnews.com

Companies based in Richardson, Texas
Nestlé
Restaurants established in 2000
Restaurants in Texas
Defunct restaurant chains in the United States
2000 establishments in Texas
2022 mergers and acquisitions
Companies disestablished in 2022
Restaurants disestablished in 2022
Food and drink companies disestablished in 2022